Suzannah Bianco (born May 15, 1973) is an American competitor in synchronized swimming and Olympic champion.

Bianco was born in San Jose, California. She participated on the American team that received a gold medal in synchronized swimming, team event at the 1996 Summer Olympics in Atlanta.

References

1973 births
Living people
American synchronized swimmers
Synchronized swimmers at the 1996 Summer Olympics
Olympic gold medalists for the United States in synchronized swimming
Olympic medalists in synchronized swimming
Medalists at the 1996 Summer Olympics
World Aquatics Championships medalists in synchronised swimming
Swimmers from San Jose, California
20th-century American women